Fangzhuang Station is a station on Line 14 of the Beijing Subway. It was opened on December 26, 2015, and is located in the Fangzhuang area of Fengtai District.

Station Layout 
The station has an underground island platform.

Exits 
There are 3 exits, lettered A, B, and C. Exit A is accessible.

References

Railway stations in China opened in 2015
Beijing Subway stations in Fengtai District